Seven is a 2019 Indian mystery thriller film directed and filmed by Nizar Shafi, and produced by Ramesh Varma. Shot simultaneously in Telugu and Tamil languages, the film features Havish, Rahman, Nandita Swetha and Regina Cassandra in lead roles.

Plot

While investigating an enigmatic man named Karthik, a police officer is bewildered by the conflicting statements about his identity. Three young women seem to share a mysterious connection with him and claim Karthik as their husband who has gone missing a few days/months before. An old man from an asylum claims that he knew Karthik as Krishnamurthy, who had died thirty years ago. The next day the old man was found killed. After the old man's death, another woman called Priya appears and claims Karthik as her husband, who has been missing since the previous day. The police officers are in shock with her claim because they had arrested Karthik two days before as the suspect of the old man's murder. During the investigation, Karthik fails to recognize the other three women who claimed him as their husband. In the next scene the woman is brought to the imprisoned Karthik. When she sees Karthik, they both smile at each other and suddenly the woman pulls a gun and shoots him. The police officer stops her act and asks her intention for doing thus. She reveals her love story and marriage with Karthik. After her marriage, due to some misunderstanding Karthik leaves her, after a few months she reads news about Karthik and the affairs he had with other three women (who claimed Karthik as their husband in the first half of the story). She was shocked with the news and assumed that Karthik is a playboy who had spoiled four women's lives (including hers) so, she decides that he is not fit to live. Karthik escapes from the hospital and with the help of a journalist he goes in search of those girls to know their intention to cause such trouble in his life. There he finds all the allegations given towards him are false as they have staged a drama against Karthik on the request of Saraswati, an old lady. Sarswati, the woman behind the scene is the main culprit who saves those girls from getting raped which was staged by herself as she wanted the help of those girls to trouble Karthik for revenge. This lady is shown to be Karthik's father's ex-wife who kills her father and stages a drama to marry Krishnamoorthy (father of Karthik). On their nuptial night, Krishnamurthy realizes that Saraswati has psychotic behavior and the murderer of her father and Krishnamoorthy's fiancée Bhanu's family. He escapes and jumps into a river. Saraswati is sent to an asylum and released after a few years. She sees Krishnamoorthy living a happy life with Bhanu and two children. She kills them on the same day except the son who turned out to be Karthik. At present, she still hallucinates Karthik for Krishnamoorthi and wants to kill him as a revenge for rejecting her. She kidnaps Priya the wife of Karthik and threatens him at gunpoint telling him to kill himself. In an attempt to save Karthik, ACP Vijay Prakash gets injured. The police shoot her in her leg and she finally shoots herself without letting them know the hideout of Priya. Finally Karthik and the police find Priya at the basement and she apologises for misunderstanding Karthik and they reunite.

Cast

 Havish as Karthik / Krishnamurthy
 Rahman as Vijay Prakash
 Regina Cassandra as Saraswathi
 Nandita Swetha as Ramya
 Anisha Ambrose as Jenny
 Tridha Choudhury as Priya
 Pujita Ponnada as Bhanu
 Aditi Arya as Abhinaya
 Vidyullekha Raman as Karthik's coworker
 Dhanraj as Karthik's coworker (Telugu version)
 Kishore Rajkumar as Karthik's coworker (Tamil version)
 Satya as a journalist
 Sangeetha V

Production
The film started production as a Telugu film, but the film became bilingual after producer M. S. Sharavanan expressed interest in a Tamil version. Havish requested that the makers rope in another artist for the Tamil version as he was not fluent in the language, but they were keen that Havish do it.

Music
The music is composed by Chaitan Bharadwaj.

Home media
The film became available as VOD on Netflix in August 2019.

References

External links
 

2019 films
2010s Tamil-language films
2019 thriller drama films
Indian multilingual films
2010s Telugu-language films
2019 multilingual films
2019 thriller films
Indian thriller drama films
Films set in Andhra Pradesh
Films scored by Chaitan Bharadwaj